The Calpine Center is a 453 ft (138m) tall postmodern skyscraper in Downtown Houston, Texas. The building has 33 floors of Class A office space. The building has the world headquarters of Calpine Corporation. Hines and Prime Asset Management jointly developed the building. The Houston office of HOK designed the building, and Turner Construction acted as the general contractor. It is connected to the downtown tunnel system. Mark Russell of Studley, a real estate firm, said that the Calpine Center is more efficient than many of the tall office buildings built in Houston in the early 1980s.

History
Originally Calpine intended to lease  of space. By February 2003 Calpine announced that it would sublease some of the space to other firms. The Calpine Center was scheduled for completion at the end of 2003. In July 2003 the space was 82% booked for occupation. Calpine and Burlington Resources, another energy company, leased space in the building; each company agreed to lease  of space. The building opened on Monday November 10, 2003. Other tenants that had occupied the building by its opening included Cheniere Energy Inc. and Hines's southwest region development office. In 2004 Avalon Advisors LP agreed to lease  of space in the building, bringing its occupancy level to 86%.

See also
List of tallest buildings in Houston

References

External links
Emporis
Skyscraperpage

Skyscraper office buildings in Houston
Commercial buildings completed in 2003
Buildings and structures in Houston